Revision:Revise is the first studio album from A Bullet for Pretty Boy. Razor & Tie alongside Artery Recordings released the album on November 9, 2010.

Critical reception

Awarding the album four stars from HM Magazine, Doug Van Pelt states, "ABFPB have all the ingredients for intense fun: excellent, tight drumming; killer guitars; high, clean vocals, growls and chant-along gang vocals." Ryan Gardner, rating the album a seven out of ten for AbsolutePunk, writes, " Full of energy and passion, Revision:Revise is a true fire breather from start to finish." Giving the album a seven and a half out of ten, Sebastian Fonseca says, "Revision: Revise has restored my faith in many ways." Steve, awarding the album three stars by Indie Vision Music, describes, "this is a very solid album." Giving the album two and a half stars at The New Review, Josh Velliquette says, "It's time to put the crayons down."

Track listing

Personnel 

A Bullet for Pretty Boy line-up 
Danon Saylor – unclean vocals
Chris Johnston – lead guitar
Derrick Sechrist – rhythm guitar, clean vocals
Taylor Kimball – bass guitar
Josh Modisette – keyboards, backing vocals
Jared Easterling – drums

Additional musicians
Tyler Carter – additional vocals on track 10

Production
 Produced by Cameron Mizell @ Chango Studios

References

2010 debut albums
Razor & Tie albums
A Bullet for Pretty Boy (band) albums